The 2020 Portuguese Grand Prix (officially known as the Formula 1 Heineken Grande Prémio de Portugal 2020) was a Formula One motor race that was held on 25 October 2020 at the Algarve International Circuit in Portimão, Portugal. It was the first Portuguese Grand Prix held since 1996 and the first time held at the Algarve International Circuit. The race was the twelfth round of the 2020 Formula One World Championship.

Lewis Hamilton's victory put him ahead of Michael Schumacher for most victories in Formula One with 92.

Background

Impact of the COVID-19 pandemic 
The 2020 Formula One World Championship was heavily affected by the COVID-19 pandemic. Most of the originally planned Grands Prix were cancelled or postponed, prompting the FIA to draft a new calendar. The Portuguese Grand Prix did not feature on the original 2020 schedule, but was added in July 2020 in order to maximise the number of races in the season.

Up to 45,000 fans were initially expected to attend the race. However, due to a surge of cases attributed to the COVID-19 pandemic in the country, the number of fans allowed to attend the race was later reduced to 27,500.

Entrants

Ten teams (each representing a different constructor) each entered two drivers. The drivers and teams were the same as those on the season entry list with no additional stand-in drivers for either the race or practice.

Tyres 

Sole Formula One tyre manufacturer Pirelli brought their C1, C2 and C3 compound tyres for teams to use in the race, the three hardest compounds available. Pirelli also tested the  tyre compounds during the first 30 minutes of the second practice session.

Other
Former Renault and Caterham driver Vitaly Petrov was given the role of driver steward for the weekend, however was required to depart the role during the weekend following the death of his father. Bruno Correia, the Safety Car driver for Formula E and the World Touring Car Cup and a local to Portimão, took his place for the remainder of the weekend.

Practice
The first practice session ran without incidents and ended with Valtteri Bottas fastest ahead of Mercedes teammate Lewis Hamilton and Red Bull driver Max Verstappen. The second practice session saw two red flags; the first when Pierre Gasly's AlphaTauri caught fire, the second when Lance Stroll and Verstappen collided. The session ended with Bottas fastest ahead of Verstappen and McLaren's Lando Norris. The race stewards investigated the Stroll–Verstappen collision and took no action. Following the collision, Verstappen referred to Stroll as a "mongol" on the team radio to his engineer, a comment which was condemned by the Mongolian government as being offensive.  The third practice session was red flagged in the final minute of the session after Sebastian Vettel ran over a drain cover. which subsequently came loose. The session ended with Bottas fastest ahead of Hamilton and Verstappen.

Qualifying 
The start of qualifying was delayed to allow track repairs to be completed. The repairs were deemed necessary after a drain cover came loose at the end of the final practice session.

Qualifying classification

Race 
On the first lap, Pérez and Verstappen made contact, forcing the former to pit and dropping him down the order. Pérez would eventually recover to finish seventh. The opening few laps of the race were chaotic as the drivers who started on the medium tyres (Hamilton, Bottas, and Leclerc) fell behind those who started on the soft tyre, and so after the second lap Sainz was leading the race from seventh on the grid until being passed by the faster cars from lap 6 onwards. On lap 18, Stroll tried to pass Norris around the outside of turn 1, but Stroll misjudged the manoeuvre and collided with Norris resulting in a 5-second penalty for Stroll.

Hamilton took his 92nd race win, passing seven-time world champion Michael Schumacher's record for most Grand Prix wins. He finished ahead of his teammate Bottas by 25.592s, the second-biggest winning margin of the season, and Verstappen in 3rd position, making his 40th appearance on the podium.

Race classification 

 Notes
  – Includes one point for fastest lap.
  – Romain Grosjean finished 16th on the track, but received a five-second time penalty for exceeding track limits.

Championship standings after the race

Drivers' Championship standings

Constructors' Championship standings

 Note: Only the top five positions are included for both sets of standings.
 Competitors marked with an asterisk still had a mathematical chance of winning the Championship.

Notes

References

External links 
 

Portuguese
Portuguese Grand Prix
Portuguese Grand Prix
Portuguese Grand Prix